The 2016 Curaçao Sekshon Pagá was the 90th season of top-flight association football in Curaçao, and the 39th season of the competition being branded as the Sekshon Pagá. The regular season began on 17 April 2016 and ended on 6 September 2016. The playoffs began 8 September 2016 and ended with the final 6 November 2016. The defending champions, Centro Dominguito successfully defended their title against Scherpenheuvel.

Regular season

Kaya Tournament

Kaya 6

Kaya 4

Final

References 

2016
1
1